Calyptromyia barbata is a species of fly in the family Tachinidae.

Distribution
China, Taiwan, North Vietnam & Japan.

References

Phasiinae
Diptera of Asia
Insects described in 1915